The caper is a perennial spiny shrub that bears rounded, fleshy leaves and big white to pinkish-white flowers, best known for the edible flower buds (capers).

Caper or Capers may also refer to:

Dance 
A caper is a jump also known as a cabriole or capriole in ballet and dressage.

People with the name
 Capers (name)
 Flavius Caper, a 2nd-century Latin grammarian

Organizations
 CAPER, the Center for Addiction, Personality and Emotion Research at the University of Maryland, College Park
 CBU Capers, the athletic teams of Cape Breton University

Other uses
 Capers (album), a 1981 album by saxophonist Steve Lacy
 Capers (1937 film), a German film directed by Gustaf Gründgens
 The Brooklyn Heist, also released as Capers, a 2008 film
 Caper film, another term for a heist film
 Caper Peak, located in Glacier National Park, Montana
 Caper, a resident of Cape Breton Island
 Caper, slang for a crime or mischievous act
 Caper elimia (Elimia olivula), a species of gastropod
 Caper spurge, Euphorbia lathyris, a plant whose seed pods look like capers

See also
 Caper White (disambiguation)